Thai Poosam Kavady is a Tamil religious festival dedicated to Hindu god Lord Murugan that is celebrated by Tamil people in India.

Symbolism 
Kavady translates in Tamil language as a pole slung across the shoulder to evenly distribute the weight of whatever is being carried, usually in bundles on either ends of the pole. The carrying of kavady symbolizes the carrying of one's burden and then resting it at the feet of the Lord.

See also 
 Thaipusam

References 

Hindu festivals
Religious festivals in South Africa
Culture of Indian diaspora
Tamil festivals